"Distortion" is a single recorded by American singer Jessica Sutta (released under her shortened "J Sutta" billing). The track, taken from her 2017 album I Say Yes, became her fourth number-one single in the United States on Billboard's Dance Club Songs chart, reaching the summit in its February 18, 2017 issue.

Music video
The music video mostly takes place in a desert but goes to many different locations such as by a train, a hotel room and being in a van, with Sutta and her friends along with her. It then shows Sutta and her friends by a pool, by a motel and outside chasing each other around. There is also a fire going on as well as many smoke bombs of various colors going off. The video is about being free and being able to take on whatever. The video starts with Sutta and her friends at the desert, going to numerous locations such as the streets, going and playing with bikes and skateboards and other risky things. The video is mostly seen with Sutta and her on screen boyfriend. The song's music video has been compared to Katy Perry's song Teenage Dream.

Track listings
Digital download
"Distortion" (Explicit) – 3:15 
"Distortion" (Clean) – 3:11

Digital download (Remixes)
"Distortion" (Dave Audé Extended Remix)
"Distortion" (Dave Audé Radio Mix)
"Distortion" (Dave Audé Dub Remix)
"Distortion" (Ivan Gomez Extended Remix)
"Distortion" (Ivan Gomez Dub)
"Distortion" (Fight Clvb Extended Remix)
"Distortion" (Fight Clvb Instrumental)
"Distortion" (Avedon Extended Remix)
"Distortion" (Avedon Remix) [Clean]
"Distortion" (Avedon Radio Mix)
"Distortion" (Avedon Instrumental)
"Distortion" (DirtyFreqs Remix)

Charts

References

External links
Official video at YouTube

2016 songs
2016 singles
2017 singles
Dance-pop songs
Electronic songs
House music songs
Songs written by Jessica Sutta